Piece is a village in Cornwall, England.

References

Villages in Cornwall